Sir Robert John Buxton, 1st Baronet  (27 October 1753 – 7 June 1839) was an English politician and abolitionist who sat in the House of Commons between 1790 and 1806.

Buxton was born at Rushford, Norfolk,  the son of John Buxton and his wife Elizabeth Jacob and grandson of John Buxton who designed and built Shadwell Court at Rushford. The Norfolk Buxtons are thought to have taken their name from the Norfolk village of that name and to have descended from Robert Buxton MP (1533-1607) an attorney in the service of Thomas Duke of Norfolk. His father was an ill-tempered character during his last years, which made the relationship between father and son increasingly difficult. Buxton was expelled  from Shadwell and  his father severely cut his income after he married without his father's consent. They were reconciled by 1779, three years before his father's death. 
  
Buxton was elected Member of Parliament (MP) for Thetford in 1790 and held the seat until 1796. In 1797 he was elected MP for Great Bedwyn and held the seat until 1806. He was a loyal supporter of William Pitt.  He campaigned openly for the abolition of slavery throughout his political career, and on several occasions advocated prison reform. In 1802,  he supported Sir Robert Peel's proposals to regulate child labour.  On behalf of the landed interest, he opposed measures such as the regulation of labourers' wages or the sale of corn in the public market. He was a fervent patriot and supported the government's war effort where possible. He backed the increase of the militia  and the Additional Force Act of 1804. He was created a Baronet of Shadwell Court in the County of Norfolk on 25 November 1800.

Buxton died at age 85 at Shadwell Lodge, Norfolk.

He married Juliana Mary Beevor, daughter of Sir Thomas Beevor, 1st Bt. and Elizabeth Branthwaite, on 22 May 1777 at St. George's Church, St. George Street, Hanover Square, London. His son John succeeded to the baronetcy.

References

External links 

 

1753 births
1839 deaths
Members of the Parliament of Great Britain for English constituencies
British MPs 1790–1796
British MPs 1796–1800
Members of the Parliament of the United Kingdom for English constituencies
UK MPs 1801–1802
UK MPs 1802–1806
Baronets in the Baronetage of Great Britain
English abolitionists